Loren Robert Kaufman (July 27, 1923 – February 10, 1951) was a soldier in the United States Army during the Korean War. He received the Medal of Honor for his actions on 4–5 September 1950 during the Battle of Yongsan. He was later killed in action before being awarded the Medal of Honor and is buried at Willamette National Cemetery.

Kaufman joined the Army from his birthplace the week after the Attack on Pearl Harbor, and served in North Africa and Europe during World War II.

Medal of Honor citation
Rank and organization: Sergeant First Class, U.S. Army, Company G, 9th Infantry Regiment, 2nd Infantry Division

Place and date: Near Yongsan, Korea, 4 and September 5, 1950,

Entered service at: The Dalles, Oregon. Born: July 27, 1923, The Dalles, Oregon.

G.O. No.: 61, August 2, 1951.

Citation:

Sfc. Kaufman distinguished himself by conspicuous gallantry and intrepidity above and beyond the call of duty in action. On the night of 4 September the company was in a defensive position on 2 adjoining hills. His platoon was occupying a strong point 2 miles away protecting the battalion flank. Early on 5 September the company was attacked by an enemy battalion and his platoon was ordered to reinforce the company. As his unit moved along a ridge it encountered a hostile encircling force. Sfc. Kaufman, running forward, bayoneted the lead scout and engaged the column in a rifle and grenade assault. His quick vicious attack so surprised the enemy that they retreated in confusion. When his platoon joined the company he discovered that the enemy had taken commanding ground and pinned the company down in a draw. Without hesitation Sfc. Kaufman charged the enemy lines firing his rifle and throwing grenades. During the action, he bayoneted 2 enemy and seizing an unmanned machine gun, delivered deadly fire on the defenders. Following this encounter the company regrouped and resumed the attack. Leading the assault he reached the ridge, destroyed a hostile machine gun position, and routed the remaining enemy. Pursuing the hostile troops he bayoneted 2 more and then rushed a mortar position shooting the gunners. Remnants of the enemy fled to a village and Sfc. Kaufman led a patrol into the town, dispersed them, and burned the buildings. The dauntless courage and resolute intrepid leadership of Sfc. Kaufman were directly responsible for the success of his company in regaining its positions, reflecting distinct credit upon himself and upholding the esteemed traditions of the military service.

Legacy 
The Veterans Administration clinic in The Dalles, Oregon is named in Kaufman's honor.  The clinic provided veterans with primary care, medical laboratory services, and a range of other health care services.

See also

List of Medal of Honor recipients
List of Korean War Medal of Honor recipients

Notes

References

1923 births
1951 deaths
United States Army Medal of Honor recipients
American military personnel killed in the Korean War
People from The Dalles, Oregon
Burials at Willamette National Cemetery
Korean War recipients of the Medal of Honor
United States Army personnel of World War II
United States Army personnel of the Korean War
United States Army non-commissioned officers